Mostki  is a village in the administrative district of Gmina Narewka, within Hajnówka County of Podlaskie Voivodeship in north-eastern Poland. This village is close to the border with Belarus.

References

Mostki